Kuropatnik  is a village in the administrative district of Gmina Strzelin, within Strzelin County, Lower Silesian Voivodeship, in south-western Poland. Prior to 1945 it was in Germany.

The village has a population of 1,956.

References

External links
 Kuropatnik

Kuropatnik